Gray Area Foundation for the Arts, Inc. is a 501(c)3 non-profit organization supporting art and technology for social good in San Francisco, California. Gray Area hosts exhibitions and music events, software and electronics classes, a media lab, and resident-artist program. Gray Area Foundation for the Arts’ stated purpose is to bring “together the best creative coders, data artists, designers, and makers to create experiments that build social consciousness through digital culture.”

Founded in 2006 by its Executive Director Josette Melchor and Board Chairman Peter Hirshberg, Gray Area joins similarly focused institutions, like Eyebeam Art and Technology Center and Ars Electronica, in promoting the intersections of art, technology and community by working to produce, exhibit, and develop the creative technical skills that allow for experimentation with and exploration of the most contemporary technologies.

History
Melchor and Hirshberg initially opened Gray Area Gallery in San Francisco's South of Market (SoMa) in 2006, following a conversation about the lack of proper venues for the exhibition of new media and technology based art work. By 2008, the gallery incorporated as a non-profit and was renamed Gray Area Foundation for The Arts. In June 2009, Gray Area relocated to its facility 55 Taylor Street, (later, 923 Market Street, then, 2665 Mission Street), near the beginning of Taylor Street. In total, the  location had included in addition to the pornography arcade, a bar (Club 65) and liquor store. Leased from property owner Jack Sumski, the space allowed Gray Area to expand its well-established exhibition platform to include artist residencies, educational workshops and symposiums, growing Gray Area into the comprehensive and integrated center for the creation and promotion of technology-based art it is today.

When the Art Theatres pornography arcade that had been there since the 1970s moved out, Sumski decided that "it was time to do something in my old age, to get something going, and give the Tenderloin a future" and invested heavily to prepare the site for Gray Area. Gray Area Foundation for The Arts is part of a coalition of city agencies, arts organizations and community service providers seeking to revitalize a neighborhood that has historically struggled with the effects of substance abuse, addiction, and poverty.

Programs

Exhibitions 
Gray Area regularly hosts exhibitions focusing on interactive multimedia and technology, by local and international artists.  
Past exhibitions held at Gray Area Foundation for the Arts:
 Zimoun: Solo Exhibition Zimoun
 Milleux Sonores: Daniel Bisig/Martin Neukom/Jan Schacher, Jason Kahn, Yves Netzhammer/Bernd Schurer, Felix Profos and Jeroen Strijbos/Rob van Rijswijk.
 Open: C.E.B. Reas, Camille Utterback
 Prototype: Alphonzo Solorzano, Gabriel Dunne, Ryan Alexander, Miles Stemper & Daniel Massey
 Transpose: Aaron Koblin & Robert Hodgin

Education
Gray Area Foundation for the Arts offers educational workshops in open source software, such as Processing, SuperCollider, openFrameworks and Arduino as well as electronic sewing, soft circuitry, and wearable technology.
Throughout the COVID global pandemic in 2020, Gray Area brought all of its education programs online to reach creators all over the globe.

Gray Area Festival
Launched in 2015, the Gray Area Festival is the first International media arts festival in San Francisco. The format of the festival is art show, daily talks and night performances. With initial presentations by Jane Metcalfe, Michael Naimark, Golan Levin, Camille Utterback and night events by Shigeto, Alessandro Cortini and more. The success of the event led to follow-up festivals in 2016, 2017, and a 2018 edition.

2015 

After the successful #ReviveTheGrand campaign which led to the update of the current home of the Gray Area Foundation for the Arts, the first Gray Area Festival took place in 2015.

2016 

The 2nd year of the Gray Area Festival focused on a prompt by Buckminster Fuller and a holistic approach to the arts. The event kicked off with the Refraction Exhibition.

2017 

The 3rd year of the Gray Area Festival focused on the challenges to the optimism of the future.

2018 

The Gray Area Festival returned in 2018 with a focus on Blockchain, Distributed Systems and Art as the main theme. The event opened with the Distributed Systems exhibition curated by Barry Threw. The next two days Friday July 27 and Saturday July 28 hosted daytime high level talks around the festival theme with night-time audio visual performances.

2019 

The Gray Area Festival 2019 focused on experience including augmented reality, virtual reality and XR. 2019 centered around the Experiential Space Research Lab, ISM Hexadrome and a robotic exoskeleton performance, Inferno. Also, Gray Area Founder, Josette Melchor, transitioned her role from Executive Director to Board Member making the Gray Area Executive Director, Barry Threw who also served as the curator of Gray Area Festival 2019.

2020 

The 6th Gray Area Festival persisted through the challenge of the Coronavirus Pandemic to hold the Gray Area Festival 2020 "Radical Simulation", virtually. Professor D. Fox Harrell from MIT and Ruha Benjamin keynoted the festival. The festival featured Anti-Gone by Theo Triantafyllidis, 
Amelia Winger-Bearskin, Phazero, LaTurbo Avedon, Lawrence Lek, Morehshin Allahyari and Stephanie Dinkins.

Partnerships and projects
Gray Area Foundation for The Arts has partnered with MIT Senseable City Lab to produce a multi-faceted series of community initiatives and symposiums called Senseable Cities Speaker Series.

City Centered Festival brought together artists, educators and community leaders within the Tenderloin district to generate ideas of using 'locative media' to better understand and connect in their environment.

Syzygryd is a collaboration with three other arts organizations (Interpretive Arson, False Profit Labs & Ardent Heavy Industries), to create a large scale interactive art piece to be unveiled at the 2010 Burning Man event.

Artist residency
The first five resident artists (Alphonzo Solorzano, Gabriel Dunne, Ryan Alexander, Miles Stemper and Daniel Massey) moved into the space in July 2009. In 2010, three of these resident artists remained. (Gabriel Dunne, Ryan Alexander and Daniel Massey) In 2021 Gray Area partnered with the Human Rights Foundation to launch the Art in Protest Residency Program. The program s an opportunity for artists whose art is dedicated to promoting democracy and human rights globally, to explore and expand their digital practices.

Arts Incubator 
The Gray Area Incubator is a peer-driven community of creators developing work at the intersection of art and technology. Membership is a 6-month commitment, though many have continued on much longer to develop their works in the Incubator. Artists work in the disciplines of Visual Media Arts, Creative Code, Virtual & Augmented Reality, Civic Engagement & Digital Activism, Social Entrepreneurship, Data Science, Sound & Audio, and Software & Hardware.

Media coverage
Gray Area's Josette Melchor was selected as one of the five innovators showcased on Ford's The Edge of Progress Tour.

After the 2016 Oakland "Ghostship" warehouse fire, Gray Area raised approximately $1.3 million from over 12,000 donors which it distributed to 390 applicants, ranging from deceased victims' next of kin, displaced residents, people injured in the fire, as well as people who would not be acknowledged by traditional disaster relief organizations, including chosen family within marginalized communities.

References

External links
 

Arts organizations based in California
Neighborhood associations
Non-profit organizations based in San Francisco
New media art
New media artists
Digital art
Computer art
Culture of San Francisco
Arts organizations established in 2006
2006 establishments in California